Saint-Charles-de-Percy War Cemetery is a British Second World War cemetery of Commonwealth soldiers located  west of the village of Saint-Charles-de-Percy, some  south-west of Caen in Normandy. The cemetery contains 703 identified Commonwealth war graves and is the southernmost British cemetery in Normandy.

History
The majority of the soldiers interred in the cemetery were killed in late July and early August 1944. British forces pushed south from Caumont-l'Éventé towards Vire to split the German 7th Army and 5th Panzer Army.

Notable burials
 Brigadier Sir Walter Balfour Barttelot, 6th Guards Tank Brigade commander, killed in action on 16 August 1944 at Caumont-l'Éventé.

Location

See also
 List of military cemeteries in Normandy

References

Further reading
 Shilleto, Carl, and Tolhurst, Mike (2008). A Traveler’s Guide to D-Day and the Battle of Normandy. Northampton, Mass.: Interlink.

External links
 

British military memorials and cemeteries
Canadian military memorials and cemeteries
Commonwealth War Graves Commission cemeteries in France
Operation Overlord cemeteries
World War II memorials in France
1944 establishments in France